Twilight Fields is an album by  German composer and multi-instrumentalist Stephan Micus recorded in 1987 and released on the ECM label.

Reception
The Allmusic review by Jim Brenholts awarded the album 3 stars stating "Twilight Fields is a set of smooth, acoustic ambience from Stephan Micus, a master of the craft. He uses flutes, marimbas, xylophones, and ethnic percussion to generate this atmospheric experience".

Track listing
All compositions by Stephan Micus
 "Part I" - 8:35 
 "Part II" - 8:00 
 "Part III" - 4:35 
 "Part IV" - 10:00
 "Part V"- 15:01

Personnel
Stephan Micus — shakuhachi, Bavarian zither, hammered dulcimer, nay, flowerpots

References

ECM Records albums
Stephan Micus albums
1988 albums
Albums produced by Manfred Eicher